The 2017–18 Conference USA men's basketball season began with practices in October 2017, followed by the start of the 2017–18 NCAA Division I men's basketball season in November. Conference play began in late December and concluded in early March.

Middle Tennessee claimed the outright regular season championship with a win over Western Kentucky on March 1, 2018. Old Dominion finished in second place in the regular season, one game behind the Blue Raiders.

Middle Tennessee's Nick King was named C-USA Player of the Year and UTSA's Steve Henson was named the Coach of the Year.

The C-USA tournament was held from March 7 through 10, 2018 at The Ford Center at The Star in Frisco, Texas. Marshall defeated Western Kentucky to win the tournament championship for the first time. As a result, the Thundering Herd received the conference's automatic bid to the NCAA tournament. No other C-USA school received an NCAA Tournament bid. The Herd went 1–1 in the Tournament. Middle Tennessee and Western Kentucky received a bid to the National Invitation Tournament. The teams combined go 4–2 in the NIT, with Western Kentucky advancing to the semifinals. North Texas and UTSA received bids to the CBI and CIT respectively.

Head coaches

Coaching changes 
On March 5, 2017, North Texas fired head coach Tony Benford after five years without a winning season. On March 13, the school hired Arkansas State head coach Grant McCasland to the same role.

On March 21, 2017, Rice head coach Mike Rhoades resigned to become the head coach at VCU. He finished at Rice with a three-year record of 47–52. On March 23, the school promoted assistant coach Scott Pera to head coach.

On November 27, 2017 UTEP dropped to 1–5 on the season, head coach Tim Floyd announced that he was retiring effective immediately. The school had previously announced a new athletic director, Jim Senter, a week prior, but Floyd said that had nothing to do with his decision. Assistant Phil Johnson was named interim head coach of the Miners the next day.

On December 14, 2017, Charlotte head coach Mark Price was fired after a 3–6 start to the season and was replaced by Houston Fancher. Fancher was named interim coach for the remainder of the season.

Coaches 

Notes: 
 All records, appearances, titles, etc. are from time with current school only. 
 Year at school includes 2017–18 season.
 Overall and C-USA records are from time at current school and are through the end of the 2017–18 season.

Preseason

Preseason Coaches Poll
Source

() first place votes

Preseason All-C-USA Team
Source

Conference schedules

Conference matrix
This table summarizes the head-to-head results between teams in conference play.

Players of the Week
Throughout the conference regular season, the C-USA offices named one or two players of the week and one or two freshmen of the week each Monday.

All-C-USA honors and awards
Following the regular season, the conference selected outstanding performers based on a poll of league coaches.

Postseason

C-USA Tournament 

Only the top 12 conference teams were eligible for the tournament.

NCAA tournament

National Invitation Tournament

References